In enzymology, a membrane-oligosaccharide glycerophosphotransferase is an enzyme that catalyzes the chemical reaction in which a glycerophospho group is transferred from one membrane-derived oligosaccharide to another.

This enzyme belongs to the family of transferases, specifically those transferring non-standard substituted phosphate groups.  The systematic name of this enzyme class is membrane-derived-oligosaccharide-6-(glycerophospho)-D-glucose:membra ne-derived-oligosaccharide-D-glucose glycerophosphotransferase. Other names in common use include periplasmic phosphoglycerotransferase, and phosphoglycerol cyclase.

References

 

EC 2.7.8
Enzymes of unknown structure